Amaxia reticulata is a moth of the family Erebidae. It was described by Walter Rothschild in 1909. It is found in French Guiana, Suriname and the Brazilian state of Amazonas.

References

Moths described in 1909
Amaxia
Moths of South America